Kosmos 396 ( meaning Cosmos 396) was a test flight of the Zenit-4M military surveillance satellite. The Zenit satellite's purpose was high resolution photographic reconnaissance. This particular test flight returned a capsule containing exposed film.

See also

 1971 in spaceflight

References

Kosmos satellites
Zenit-2 satellites
1971 in the Soviet Union
Spacecraft launched in 1971